Kheroth Mohini Bose (1866–1935) was a physician and missionary who dedicated her life to medical missionary work in the town of Asrapur, also referred to as Araspur, in India. She served with the Church of England Zenana Missionary Society until her death. She was the head of the medical mission in Asrapur in 1889.  Bose was the nurse in Asrapur and pioneered the care of Women across the Punjab region. She died shortly after retirement in 1935.  She was one of the founders of the Lady Irwin Tuberculosis Sanatorium. Bose was awarded the Kaiser-i-Hindi silver medal for her service.  Bose used her 50 years of service to bring quality medical care to a previously impoverished area.

Early life and education 
Kheroth Bose was the daughter of an Indian Pleader. She came to the town of Asrapur as a child to attend the girls' school where Ms. Perkins taught. Her sister, Mona Bose, also attended the school. At the age of 19, she was sent with her sister to England to study medical care. For 18 months, she devoted herself entirely to learning how to care for female patients in India. Her training was mostly done at the Hospital for Women and Children in England and Dr. Griffith’s Home, where she stayed during her time in England. She also received some training at the Great Ormond Street Children’s Hospital. The mission originally did not want to send Kheroth and Mona Bose to England, because they believed there were better candidates. However, their teacher and mentor who is only ever mentioned as Mrs. Henderson advocated for them and noted the dire need for a teacher and female nurse practitioner in Asrapur and Amristar.

Call to serve 
Bose was heavily influenced by the church and often talks about the will of God in her book titled "The village of hope, or, The history of Asrapur". Asrapur is located in the modern-day state of Punjab in India. Bose covers in detail the founding of the town by two retired Christians who were once members of India's Parliament. As a child, Bose was taken in by the founders of the town, Mr. and Mrs. Perkins. Bose became a missionary at the age of 19. As this time, she had no medical training. She was sent to England and returned to be the Nurse of the Mission and surrounding area. Bose says that Mr. and Mrs. Perkins taught her to believe in God and serve the poor. Her motivation was primarily to treat the women of the Punjab region, helping to elevate the level of care they received. Bose was very devout, she dedicates the majority of her book to talking about the impact of the lord’s work on her life and on the town of Asrapur.

Service 
After her return from England in 1889, Bose was put in charge of the medical work at Asrapur. A short time later, the Hospital at Asrapur was built and Bose led the staff of doctors and nurses there for the remainder of her career. For fifty years she was the only consistent medical professional in the region. Many other missionaries also worked in the region but few lasted longer than a couple of years. In her resignation letter, she urges the Missionary Society to send someone new to replace her, indicating her continuing devotion to the people of Asrapur. Bose was responsible for the medical care of around 1000 people in Asrapur who were both English and Indian. Her presence in Asrapur was invaluable because she was able to care for women and children who had previously not been able to receive care. She was also a trained midwife, an important asset to her work. Bose spoke both Punjabi and English. Because of her proficiency in both languages, she also served on a variety of committees throughout her time as a missionary. As a devout Christian, she was heavily involved in the religious aspect of the town. She was a frequent contributor to a missionary newspaper called India’s Women and China’s Daughters, where she chronicles the important religious events of the town, as well as the many milestones in care for women that she achieved.

Death and legacy 
Bose sent in her letter of resignation in October 1934 and retired from missionary work on January 1, 1935. She died on July 1, 1935, exactly 6 months after resigning from missionary service. Despite her retirement, she remained close to the mission and visited frequently. In total, Ms. Bose dedicated 50 years to her missionary service.  Kheroth Bose was on sick leave twice during her time as a missionary. Due to the illness that killed her, which is undisclosed in all her official documents, she was sent to London for surgery. Bose died at the age of 69 at the Foreman College house in Lahore, India. Her death was widely mourned, records state that her funeral was attended by a large crowds. Her legacy as one of the first female nurses to work in rural India was widely recognized within the church missionary community. Bose used her 50 years of service to dedicate herself to the rural reconstruction in India, an initiative that she pioneered. Notably, Bose is also one of the founders of the Lady Irwin Tuberculosis Sanatorium. Although she had no children of her own, she was survived by her niece and nephew, Ms. Datta and Dr. S.K. Datta, who continued her legacy of bringing medical care to rural India.

Awards 
Bose won the Kaisar-i-Hind Medal for her dedication to the greater good in India. 
Bose was the only woman invited to the conference of influential Indians in England but was forced to decline on account of her poor health.

References

1866 births
1935 deaths
Christian medical missionaries
English Anglican missionaries
Anglican missionaries in India
Female Christian missionaries
Indian women nurses